The 2021 La Course by Le Tour de France was the eighth edition of La Course by Le Tour de France, a women's cycling race held in France. It took place on 26 June 2021 and was the tenth event on the 2021 UCI Women's World Tour. The event was organised by ASO, which also organises the Tour de France.  

This was the last edition of La Course, which was replaced by Tour de France Femmes in 2022.

Route
The race started in Brest and finished at the top of the Cote de la Fosse aux Loups in Landerneau, after 3 laps of the final circuit of 14.5 km. The total distance of the race was 107.4 km. La Course was held before stage 1 of the men's 2021 Tour de France.

Teams
Nine UCI Women's WorldTeams and fourteen UCI Women's Continental Teams made up the twenty-two teams that competed in the race. Of the 127 riders in the race, only 102 finished, while a further 6 riders finished over the time limit.

UCI Women's WorldTeams

 
 
 
 
 
 
 
 
 

UCI Women's Continental Teams

Results

See also
 2021 in women's road cycling

References

External links
 

2021 UCI Women's World Tour
2021
2021 in French sport
La Course
La Course, 2021